Jealousy (Italian: Gelosia) is a 1942 Italian drama film directed by Ferdinando Maria Poggioli and starring Luisa Ferida, Roldano Lupi and Ruggero Ruggeri. The film was shot at the Cinecittà Studios in Rome with sets designed by the art director Gastone Simonetti. It belongs to the movies of the calligrafismo style. It is based on the 1901 novel Il Marchese di Roccaverdina by Luigi Capuana, which was later made into a 1953 film Jealousy.

Cast
 Luisa Ferida as Agrippina Solmo  
 Roldano Lupi as Il marchese Antonio di Roccaverdina  
 Ruggero Ruggeri as Il parocco don Silvio 
 Elena Zareschi as Zosima Munoz 
 Elvira Betrone as Carmelina Munoz, sua madre  
 Wanda Capodaglio as La baronessa Santina di Lagomorto  
 Franco Coop as L'avvocato don Aquilante Guzardi  
 Bella Starace Sainati as Mamma Grazia 
 Angelo Dessy as Neli Casaccio  
 Anna Arena as Agata Casaccio, sua moglie 
 Pio Campa as Il giudice  
 Andrea D'Almaniera as Il dottore Meccio 
 Renato Navarrini as L'avvocato dell' accusa  
 Amalia Pellegrini as Un' amica del marchese di Roccaverdina  
 Peppino Spadaro as Un amico del marchese di Roccaverdina 
 Umberto Spadaro as Il testimone Sante di Mauro 
 Massimo Turci as Michele, loro piccolo figlio

References

Bibliography
 Burke, Frank . A Companion to Italian Cinema. John Wiley & Sons, 2017.

External links 

1942 films
Italian drama films
1942 drama films
1940s Italian-language films
Films directed by Ferdinando Maria Poggioli
Films shot at Cinecittà Studios
Films based on Italian novels
Italian black-and-white films
Films scored by Enzo Masetti
1940s Italian films